is a turn-based role-playing video game developed by Koei's Team-Infinite for the PlayStation, and the first in the Zill O'll series. It saw a Japan-only release on October 7, 1999, and a re-release in 2000 under the "Koei the Best" line. A remake called Zill O'll Infinite was released in 2009 on the PlayStation 2, and a prequel, Trinity: Souls of Zill O'll was released in 2010 for PlayStation 3. 

While superficially similar to Final Fantasy, the game has character creation and a nonlinear scenario system that allows the plot, including the ending, to be affected by player decisions, with time passing when moving from place to place. non-player characters can die depending on the player's involvement in their quest. Nevertheless, it was poorly received in the West and seen as a Final Fantasy clone, ultimately never being localized.

Release 
Zill O'll was the 4th best-selling video game in Japan for the week between October 4, 1999 and October 10, 1999.

Reception 
The game's turn-based combat and other gameplay was often compared to the Final Fantasy series by critics. In a preview of the game for Tokyo Game Show 1998, Console Plus called the game's graphics more detailed than FFVII, and remarked on its "superb" cutscenes. Christian Nutt of GameSpot rated the game 4.8/10 points, calling it "Koei's Final Fantasy". Saying it had "very little original content", he characterized the graphics as "quite mediocre". While praising the fact that individual enemies were visible in dungeons, he nevertheless said that they moved "lethargically" and were easily avoided. New Zealand Station called the game "highly unoriginal" and "a straight rip off from Final Fantasy", saying that it "thankfully" had not made it to local shores.

Dengeki Online praised the game's high degree of freedom in an anniversary feature, remarking on how the player could change the story and which party members joined.

Remakes 
Zill O'll Infinite and Infinite Plus were remakes of the original game, released for PS2 and PSP, respectively, with new elements.

References 
Translation

Citation

External Links 
 
 
 

1999 video games
Action role-playing video games
Fantasy video games
Japan-exclusive video games
Japanese role-playing video games
Koei games
Koei Tecmo franchises
PlayStation (console)-only games
Single-player video games
Video game franchises introduced in 1999
Video games developed in Japan